The following is a list of neighborhoods in Austin, Texas. Austin generally runs north-south and is bisected by the Colorado River.

Central Austin

Central Austin includes the city's Downtown and central neighborhoods. The area is north of the Colorado River and is enclosed by Interstate 35 to the east, approximately 51st Street/North Loop/Hancock Drive to the north, and Mopac Expressway (SL 1) to the west.

Bryker Woods
Clarksville Historic District
Caswell Heights
Downtown Austin
Eastwoods
Hancock
Heritage
Hyde Park Historic District
Judge's Hill
 Lower Waller Creek	
 North University	
 Oakmont Heights	
 Old Enfield	
 Old Pecan Street	
 Old West Austin	
 Original Austin	
 Original West University
Pemberton Heights
Rosedale
Ridgelea	
Ridgetop
Shoal Crest
Shadow Lawn Historic District
West Downtown

North Austin
North Austin is defined as a neighborhoods north of Central Austin (51st Street/North Loop/Hancock Drive).

North Central

Allandale
Balcones Woods
Barrington Oaks
Battle Bend Springs
Brentwood
Crestview
Estates of Brentwood
Hancock
Highland
North Burnet
North Campus
North Lamar
North Loop
North Shoal Creek
Saint John
Wooten

Northeast
North of 51st Street, east of Interstate 35.
Windsor Hills
Windsor Park

Northwest
North of Hancock Drive, west of Mopac Expressway.
Canyon Creek
Great Hills/Arboretum
Northwest Hills

Far North
North of Parmer Lane.
Copperfield
Wells Branch

East Austin

East Austin is defined as areas east of Interstate 35 north of the river. 
Central East Austin
East Cesar Chavez
East Congress
East End
French Place
Govalle
Holly
Mueller

West Austin

West Austin occupies a much smaller area due to the bend of the Colorado River. The area is bounded by Mopac Expressway (SL 1) to the east, the Colorado River to the south and west, and Northland Drive (RM 2222) to the north.
Far West
Tarrytown
West Congress
West End
West Line Historic District

South Austin
South Austin generally includes any area south of the Colorado River.

South Central
South Central Austin is boxed by Mopac Expressway to the west, the Colorado River to the north, Interstate 35 to the east, and Ben White Boulevard to the south.
Barton Creek
Barton Hills
Bouldin Creek
Dawson
Galindo
South Congress
South Lamar
South River City
Spyglass-Barton's Bluffs
Travis Heights
Zilker

Southeast Central/Riverside
Southeastern Austin between the Colorado River and Ben White Boulevard is generally called the Riverside area.
East Riverside-Oltorf
Montopolis
Pleasant Valley

Southeast
Neighborhoods east of Menchaca Road and south of Ben White Boulevard.
Dove Springs
Onion Creek
South Manchaca
Southeast Austin
Southpark Meadows

Southwest
Neighborhoods west of Menchaca Road and south of Ben White Boulevard and Capital of Texas Highway.
Cherry Creek
Circle C Ranch
Oak Hill
Far South Austin/Slaughter-Manchaca
Kincheonville
The Ridge at Lantana
Maple Run
Sendera
Shady Hollow
Sunset Valley (incorporated city)
Tanglewood Forest
Travis Country
Westgate
Woodstone Village

Notes

References

External links
City Data Austin Neighborhood Map
About.com: Austin Neighborhoods
City of Austin's Neighborhood Planning Page
Austin Neighborhood Information and Statistics
Estates of Brentwood neighborhood website

Neighborhoods in Austin, Texas
Texas geography-related lists
Lists of neighborhoods in U.S. cities
Neighborhoods